Channar may refer to:

Channar (surname)
Channar (Nadar Caste)
 Channar mine, an iron ore mine in Australia

See also